Abort is a 1970 Norwegian drama film directed by Vibeke Løkkeberg. It follows a young girl from the moment she discovers that she is pregnant, to the point where a doctor makes the decision about whether she is granted an abortion.

Plot 
A young girl gets pregnant, and decides to apply for abortion. We follow her until the application is answered.

External links
 
 Abort at Filmweb.no (Norwegian)

1970 films
1970 drama films
Films directed by Vibeke Løkkeberg
Norwegian drama films